December Sleep is an EP by Seirom, independently released on December 25, 2013.

Track listing

Personnel
Adapted from the December Sleep liner notes.
 Maurice de Jong (as Mories) – vocals, instruments, recording, cover art

Release history

References

External links 
 
 December Sleep at Bandcamp

2013 EPs
Seirom albums